Stuart Harris may refer to:

 Stuart Harris (architect) (1920-1977), Scottish architect and historian
 Stuart Harris (author), English author of books and articles about the internet
 Stuart Harris (cricketer) (born 1943), New Zealand cricketer
 Stuart Harris (priest) (1849–1935), Church of England priest and Royal Navy chaplain
 Stuart Harris (public servant and academic) (born 1931), Australian public servant

See also
 Stuart Harris-Logan, ethnographer, folklorist and writer